A pigpen is literally a pen that holds pigs, also known as a sty.  Pigpen may refer to:

 Pig-Pen, a character in Charles M. Schulz's comic strip Peanuts
 Pigsty (film), a 1969 film by Pier Paolo Pasolini
 Pigpen cipher, a substitution cypher in which the English letters are replaced with symbols that correspond to an easy-to-generate key
 Ron "Pigpen" McKernan (1945–1973), a founding member of the Grateful Dead
 Pig Pen, a character in the 1978 film Convoy